These are the number-one singles of 1977 according to the Top 100 Singles Chart in Cash Box magazine

References
 http://www.cashboxmagazine.com/archives/70s_files/1977.html

See also
1977 in music
Hot 100 number-one hits of 1977 (United States) by Billboard magazine
RPM number-one hits of 1977 for the #1 hits in Canada

1977
1977 record charts
1977 in American music